LifeLight Communications is a non-profit ministry based in Sioux Falls, South Dakota dedicated to taking the church outside of the walls through tours & concerts, student ministries, missions, radio, outreach events and festivals.  The best known aspect of their ministry is the LifeLight Music Festival, a free, annual Christian Music Festival held over Labor Day weekend in Worthing, South Dakota.

History
LifeLight Communications was founded in 1998 by Alan and Vicki Greene.  It started with the first LifeLight Festival which was held on a local church lawn. By 2001, the Greenes decided to pursue full-time ministry.  They have 14 staff and focus on five main facets of ministry: Festivals, Student Ministries, Tours/Concerts, Missions, and Radio.  The term LifeLight was taken from the Bible verse John 8:12-Jesus said, "I am the light of the world. Whoever follows me will not walk in darkness but have the Light of Life."

Mission
The mission of LifeLight Communications is to take the church outside the walls by uniting churches and ministries together to achieve the three main goals of their ministry, "Reaching", "Raising" and "Sending" people locally and internationally to receive and advance the gospel.

Ministries

Festivals
The annual LifeLight Music Festival is the best known aspect of the ministry.  It started on a local church lawn in 1998 then moved to the W.H. Lyon Fairgrounds in 2001.  It outgrew the Fairgrounds and moved to Wild Water West in 2005.  In 2010, it moved to a permanent home located on farmland near Worthing, South Dakota and hosted an estimated 300,000 people during the three days of the festival. The LifeLight model has expanded with a new 1 day festival in Bethany, Missouri and four festivals and two pastors conferences hosted in April 2010 in Karachi & Hyderabad, Pakistan.

Student Ministries
According to their website, the mission of their student ministries, which is called Souled Out Ministries, is to expose every teenager in our area to Jesus Christ and to connect them to a local church.  Their goal is to not only REACH a generation of teenagers for Christ but also to RAISE a generation of leaders for Him. A three-part strategy is in place to help this happen. 
1. UNITE teens, churches, pastors, youth workers and community leaders for the mission and for support. We accomplish this through citywide events, prayer gatherings, network luncheons, and campus ministry training.
2. TRAIN students, parents and Christian leaders. Student leader and campus coach training events, conferences and the providing of tools and resources all help us train current and future leaders for Christ.
3. SHARE the message of Christ with every teen on every campus in every community. Souled Out Campus Clubs are the ongoing means for sharing, but outreach events, concerts, the LifeLight Festival and mission trips help us accomplish this as well.

Tours/Concerts
LifeLight tours began in 2005 when people began asking for more music between festivals.  It started out with local artists mainly traveling to local cities.  Now, LifeLight Tours has partnered with several national and regional bands/speakers and travels well beyond the Midwest for tour dates.

Missions
The LifeLight founders took their family on a mission trip to Juarez, Mexico and have been dedicated to taking mission trips around the world ever since.  They state that missions is the core of the ministry and the purpose of their mission trips is to evangelize the lost, disciple the saved, and encourage the existing churches & missionaries around the world.  They have returned to Mexico multiple times since 1998 and have taken trips to the Rosebud Indian Reservation and most recently, Pakistan.  They have partnered with  Mission Haiti and Food for the Hungry and done work in Haiti, Ethiopia & Bangladesh and have adopted villages in Zewey & Belo, Ethiopia.

Radio
LifeLight Radio is a weekly half-hour radio show during which Alan and Vicki (or a special guest) address topics in a real and relevant way from a Biblical perspective.  It can be heard on a local radio station or online.

References

Christianity in South Dakota